Orlek is a village in the Municipality of Sežana in the Littoral region of Slovenia on the border with Italy.

References

External links
Orlek on Geopedia
Orlek local community site

Populated places in the Municipality of Sežana